The Diabolical Church Window is a 1911 French short silent film by Georges Méliès. It was numbered 1548–1556 for the catalogues of Méliès's Star Film Company, but it was ultimately produced and distributed by Pathé Frères, who advertised it as with the subtitle magie vénitienne (Venetian magic).

Méliès's daughter, Georgette Méliès, is believed to have been one of the two camera operators for this and the other five Méliès films made in 1911–1912. Only a fragment of the film is currently known to survive; the rest is presumed lost.

References

Works cited

External links
 

French black-and-white films
Films directed by Georges Méliès
French silent short films